Chümoukedima Metropolitan Area is the metropolitan area of Chümoukedima and its surrounding region, located in south-west Nagaland. It is the largest metropolitan area in Nagaland in terms of size and third largest in terms of population, after Dimapur and Kohima. It covers an area of approximately 600 km2 (231 mi2). The region forms as the commercial, financial, and industrial centre of Nagaland. The largest city is Chümoukedima, followed by Medziphema.

Transportation 
The metropolis is served by the Dimapur Airport, currently the only airport in Nagaland 

The Asian Highway 1 and Asian Highway 2 as well as the NH29 passes through the region.

Chümoukedima Shokhuvi Railway Station is currently the only operating railway station in the region.

See also 
 Geography of Nagaland

Notes

References

External links 

 
 Geography of Nagaland